Xiao Qin (born January 12, 1985, in Nanjing, Jiangsu) is a male Chinese gymnast. He specializes in the horizontal bar and parallel bars, but is best known for his work on the pommel horse for which he has won Olympic, world, national, East Asian Games, and World Cup titles. He joined the Chinese National Team in 1999 and is part of the People's Liberation Army.

Competitive highlights
He has qualified for two Olympics. At the 2004 Olympics in Athens, Xiao Qin was one of the favorites for the Olympic title on pommel horse, but his dreams were shattered when he fell during the qualification round. He qualified for the horizontal bar event final but placed 6th. It was also a disappointing Olympics for his team favored to win gold but instead finished 5th.  At the 2008 Olympics in Beijing, he redeemed himself by winning gold on the pommel horse along with gold for his team.

References

 Sohu Profile 
 2008 Team China Profile

External links
 
 
 

1985 births
Living people
Chinese male artistic gymnasts
Gymnasts at the 2004 Summer Olympics
Gymnasts at the 2008 Summer Olympics
Medalists at the World Artistic Gymnastics Championships
Olympic gold medalists for China
Olympic gymnasts of China
Sportspeople from Nanjing
World champion gymnasts
Olympic medalists in gymnastics
Medalists at the 2008 Summer Olympics
Asian Games medalists in gymnastics
Gymnasts at the 2006 Asian Games
Asian Games gold medalists for China
Medalists at the 2006 Asian Games
Gymnasts from Jiangsu
21st-century Chinese people